was a Japanese pianist, composer and arranger. He composed for popular anime series, movies and video games. His popular name was Haneken.

Biography

Haneda was born in Tokyo, Japan. After graduating from the Toho Gakuen School of Music, he taught as a professor at the Tokyo College of Music. He was best known as the composer of Wizardry—which was ported to NES and SNES console by Ascii at early 1990—, The Super Dimension Fortress Macross series, Barefoot Gen, Ys Symphony, Symphony Sorcerian and Genso Suikoden Ongaku-shu.

He died of liver cancer on June 2, 2007, at the age of 58.

Selected works

Anime soundtracks
 The Adventure of Kohsuke Kindaichi (1977)
 Treasure Island (1978)
 Space Warrior Baldios (1980)
 The White Whale of Mu (1980)
 Kyoufu Densetsu Kaiki! Frankenstein (TV movie, 1981)
 Manga Mito Kōmon (1981)
 Natsu e no Tobira (1981)
 Thunderbirds 2086 (Scientific Rescue Team Technoboyger) (1982)
 Space Cobra (1982)
 The Super Dimension Fortress Macross (1982)
 Super Dimension Century Orguss (1983)
 Final Yamato (film, 1983)
 Barefoot Gen (film, 1983)
 Bagi, the Monster of Mighty Nature (TV movie, 1984)
 God Mazinger (1984)
 Macross: Do You Remember Love? (film, 1984)
 Sherlock Hound (1984)
 Odin: Photon Sailer Starlight (film, 1985)
 Onegai! Samia Don (1985)
 Barefoot Gen 2 (film, 1986)
 Galaxy Investigation 2100: Border Planet (TV movie, 1986)
 Prefectural Earth Defense Force (OVA, 1986, with Masahiru Komatsu)
 Metal Armor Dragonar (1987, with Toshiyuki Watanabe)
 Samurai Gold (OVA, 1987)
 Project A-ko 4: FINAL (OVA, 1989)
 Sunset on Third Street (1990)
 Dear Brother (1991)
 Genji (OVA, 1992)
 Mikeneko Holmes: The Lord of Ghost Castle (OVA, 1992)

Game soundtracks
Wizardry series (Famicom and Super Famicom ports)
Suikoden

Live-action TV
Bakuryū Sentai Abaranger (2003)

Live-action movies
Bye-Bye Jupiter (1984)

External links 
Kentarō Haneda Homepage
Kentarō Haneda at Soundtrackcollector.com
Adventurer's Inn, Wizardry Music Doujinshi Fansite
Haneken CD Introduction Page
Discography of Kentarō Haneda at Raborak
Space Battleship Yamato CD Set Review and Information
Pianist Kentaro Haneda dies of cancer at 58

1949 births
2007 deaths
20th-century Japanese composers
20th-century Japanese male musicians
Anime composers
Deaths from cancer in Japan
Deaths from liver cancer
Japanese film score composers
Japanese male film score composers
Japanese music arrangers
Musicians from Tokyo
Toho Gakuen School of Music alumni
Video game composers